Katelyn Jarrell (born Bouyssou) (born June 11, 1994, in Hope, Rhode Island) is an American national competitor in judo. As a senior competitor she has won three national championships at 48 kg. (in 2008, 2010, and 2015) as well as twice finishing third (in 2008 and 2011). At all three of her appearances at the world judo championships (2009, 2010, and 2017), Bouyssou lost in the first round. Katelyn took a bronze at the Pan American Championships in 2017. She was also the youngest judoka to ever qualify for the Senior National Team.  She would win gold at the USA Junior National Olympics.  Bouyssou is also an active wrestler.  Bouyssou would earn her place on the national team by defeating reigning champion  Natalie Lafon.  Bouyssou is currently (December 2017) ranked 27th in the world in her weight division.

References

External links
 

American female judoka
1994 births
Living people
Judoka at the 2010 Summer Youth Olympics
Youth Olympic gold medalists for the United States
21st-century American women